Filani is a surname. Notable people with the surname include:

Joel Filani (born 1983), American football player and coach
Kunle Filani (born 1957), Nigerian educator and artist
Mosun Filani, Nigerian actress
Oyebanji Filani, Nigerian doctor and office holder

See also
Filan
Politiko